Robert McVeagh (22 September 1866 – 30 May 1944) was a New Zealand lawyer. He was born in Maungakawa, Waikato, New Zealand on 22 September 1866.

References

1866 births
1944 deaths
19th-century New Zealand lawyers